Vernon Ricardo Cloete (born 20 September 1985) is a Namibian former first-class cricketer.

Cloete was born at Rehoboth in September 1985 and was educated at Windhoek High School. He made his debut in first-class cricket for Namibian against Griqualand West in the 2013–14 CSA 3-Day Cup, with Cloete making four first-class appearances in that edition of the competition and a fifth in the 2014–15 edition. In five first-class appearances, Cloete scored 30 runs with a highest score of 25. With his off break bowling he took 5 wickets at an average of 61.00, with best figures of 3 for 76. In November 2011, he played three Twenty20 matches against Kenya, before making a further three appearances in the 2013–14 CSA Provincial T20 Cup. In six Twenty20 appearances, he scored 35 runs with a highest score of 28. With the ball, he took 5 wickets at an average of 17.40; his best figures in this format were 2 for 23. He plays his club cricket in Namibia for Windhoek High School Old Boys Cricket Club.

References

External links

1985 births
Living people
People from Rehoboth, Namibia
Namibian cricketers